Lingshui railway station  is a railway station on the Hainan eastern ring high-speed railway located in the town of Lingshui, Lingshui Li Autonomous County, Hainan, China.

External links
 

Railway stations in Hainan